The Show is the upcoming third studio album by Irish singer Niall Horan, due for release through Capitol Records and Horan's own publishing imprint Neon Haze on 9 June 2023. The album's lead single, "Heaven" was released on 17 February 2023.

Background and recording
On 15 February 2023, Horan announced the album title and release date.

Whilst promoting the lead single, Horan told Rolling Stone: "What makes this record incredibly special to me is it's a reflection of where I am in my life today, as a person, a musician, and of course, as a songwriter," he explained in the video. "Can't say I'm not a little nervous, but hopefully you'll still like this version of me when you listen to the new record." Horan appeared Late Night with Seth Meyers and spoke about how his last album cycle for Heartbreak Weather was heavily impacted by a series of lockdowns in 2020, meaning that he was never able to tour the project. "I'd released an album the day we were told we were going into lockdown, um – some would say that was great timing! The tour got cancelled [...] So then I was sitting around waiting for something to happen, waiting for the creative juices to flow [...] Once it came it kind of opened a door for what is now a finished product, record."

Singles
"Heaven", was released on 17 February 2023. The song debuted at number 4 on the Irish singles chart,  number 16 on the UK Official Top 100 and at number 63 in the USA on the Billboard Hot 100. "Heaven"s official music video was released one week later. In Australia, "Heaven" peaked at number 30 on that country's singles chart. An acoustic version was released on 10 March 2023.

Track listing

Release history

See also
List of 2023 albums

References

2023 albums
Capitol Records albums
Niall Horan albums
Upcoming albums